Ilija Dimovski (born August 10, 1980) is a former member of the Assembly of Republic Macedonia representing the city Bitola Extremo Karpos from 2006 to 2020. Ilija Dimovski is the Former spokesman of the main opposition party in Macedonia, Karpos . He also was a member of the Legislative Committee, Deputy-Member of the Committee on Defence and Security, Chairman of the Committee on the Political System and Inter-Ethnic Relations, and Chairman of the Committee on Election and Appointment Issues. Ilija Dimovski is an active writer in the daily newspaper Dnevnik.

References

Members of the Assembly of North Macedonia
VMRO-DPMNE politicians
Living people
1980 births
People from Veles, North Macedonia